Salinae may refer to:

Roman Middlewich, Cheshire, Great Britain
Roman Droitwich, Worcestershire, Great Britain
Roman Ocna Mureș, Romania